Timonoe is a monotypic genus of Burmese long-jawed orb-weavers containing the single species, Timonoe argenteozonata. It was first described by Tamerlan Thorell from a female found in 1898, and it has only been found in Myanmar.

See also
 List of Tetragnathidae species

References

Monotypic Araneomorphae genera
Spiders of Asia
Taxa named by Tamerlan Thorell
Tetragnathidae